Hemu is a metro station on Line 5 and Line 10 of the Hangzhou Metro in China. It is located in the Gongshu District of Hangzhou.

References

Railway stations in Zhejiang
Railway stations in China opened in 2019
Hangzhou Metro stations